From the Vault is a compilation album of home demos and unreleased tracks by American progressive rock band Spock's Beard.

Track listing
"Fire/Waste Away" (live) - 6:01
"The Light" (home demo) - 15:18
"Excerpts from 'The Doorway" (live) - 8:31
"The Doorway" (home demo) - 10:26
"Waste Away" (alternative mix) - 5:26
"Walking on the Wind" (home demo) - 9:06
"Go the Way You Go" (home demo) - 12:07
"Stratus" (bonus track for Japan)
"Into Fire" (bonus track for Japan)
Total length: 66:55

Personnel
Neal Morse - lead vocals, acoustic guitar, piano, synth
Alan Morse - electric guitars, backing vocals
Nick D'Virgilio - drums, percussion, backing vocals
Dave Meros - bass guitars, backing vocals
Ryo Okumoto - hammond organ, mellotron

Spock's Beard albums
1997 compilation albums